The 13th Infantry Regiment "Pinerolo" is a unit of the Italian Army based in Bari in Apulia. The unit is part of the Italian army's infantry corps and operationally assigned to the Mechanized Brigade "Pinerolo".

History 
The regiment was raised in 1672 by the Marchese Lullino for service in the army of Charles Emmanuel II, Duke of Savoy. In 1680 the regiment was renamed His Royal Highness Regiment of Saluzzo. The regiment participated in the Nine Years' War, War of the Spanish Succession, War of the Polish Succession, and War of the Austrian Succession.

In 1831 the regiment was divided to form the 1st and 2nd Regiment "Pinerolo", each with three battalions. Together the two regiments formed the Brigade "Pinerolo". In 1839 the regiments were renumbered as 13th  Regiment Brigade "Pinerolo" and 14th Regiment Brigade "Pinerolo". The Brigade "Pinerolo" with its two regiments participated in the First, Second, and Third Italian War of Independence.

World War I 

During World War I the Brigade "Pinerolo" fought on the Italian front. For their conduct during the war the brigade's two regiments were awarded Italy's highest military honor, the Gold Medal of Military Valour.

On 10 November 1926 the Infantry Brigade "Pinerolo" was renamed XXIV Infantry Brigade and its two regiments were renamed 13th Infantry Regiment "Pinerolo" respectively 14th Infantry Regiment "Pinerolo". The brigade also received the 225th Infantry Regiment "Arezzo" from the disbanded Infantry Brigade "Arezzo". The XXIV Infantry Brigade was the infantry component of the 24th Territorial Division of Chieti, which also included the 18th Artillery Regiment. In 1934 the division changed its name to 24th Infantry Division "Gran Sasso".

The division participated in the Second Italo-Ethiopian War, where it operated in the Tigray Region and fought in the Battle of Shire. On 24 May 1939 the division ceded 225th Infantry Regiment "Arezzo" to the newly activated 53rd Infantry Division "Arezzo". On the same day the XXIV Infantry Brigade was dissolved and the two "Pinerolo" infantry regiments came under direct command of the division, while the 18th Artillery Regiment was given the name "Pinerolo".

World War II 

The 24th Infantry Division "Pinerolo" participated in the Greco-Italian War, during which the 13th Infantry Regiment "Pinerolo" earned its second Gold Medal of Military Valour.

The 24th Infantry Division "Pinerolo" was on anti-partisan duty in Greece when the Armistice of Cassibile was announced on 8 September 1943. The division was the only Italian division in continental Greece to refuse German demands to surrender. On 15 September the division moved into the Pindus mountain range, where the commander of the division Adolfo Infante struck with the mediation of a British military mission a collaboration agreement with the Greek People's Liberation Army (ELAS). However, by October the ELAS forced the troops of the Pinerolo to surrender its supplies and weapons, and used the Italian soldiers as forced labor for the rest of the war. The remnants of the division were repatriated to Italy in March 1945.

Cold War 
On 1 April 1952 the Infantry Division "Pinerolo" was raised again in the city of Bari. The division consisted initially of the 9th Infantry Regiment "Bari" and the 13th Infantry Regiment "Pinerolo". Both regiments fielded two battalions, one less than the other divisions of the Army at the time. The division was rounded out by the 14th Field Artillery Regiment, the 9th Engineer Company and the 9th Signal Company.

On 1 September 1962 the division was reduced to brigade and the two battalions of the 13th Infantry Regiment "Pinerolo" were merged into the 9th Infantry Regiment "Bari". With the 1975 army reform the Italian Army abolished the regimental level and battalions came under direct command of the brigades. Therefore, on 1 November 1975, the 9th Infantry Regiment "Bari" was disbanded with its battalions coming under direct command of the Motorized Brigade "Pinerolo" and given the regimental flags and traditions of inactive infantry regiments. Thus the IV Battalion, 9th Infantry Regiment "Bari", was renamed 13th Motorized Infantry Battalion "Valbella" and received the flag and traditions of the 13th Infantry Regiment "Pinerolo".

With the end of the Cold War the 13th Motorized Infantry Battalion "Valbella" was disbanded on 31 December 1990.

2022 Reactivation 
On 4 October 2022 the flag and traditions of the 13th Infantry Regiment "Pinerolo" were given to the Command and Tactical Supports Unit "Pinerolo" of the Mechanized Brigade "Pinerolo".

As of reactivation the unit is organized as follows:

  13th Command and Tactical Supports Unit "Pinerolo", in Bari
 Command Company
 Signal Company

See also 
 Mechanized Brigade "Pinerolo"

External links
Italian Army Website: 13th Command and Tactical Supports Unit "Pinerolo"

References

Infantry Regiments of Italy
Military units and formations established in 1672